Adstock is a municipality in the Les Appalaches Regional County Municipality in the Chaudière-Appalaches region of Quebec, Canada. Its population in the Canada 2016 Census was 2,806.

Adstock was created on February 14, 2001, after the amalgamation of Saint-Méthode-de-Frontenac and Sacré-Coeur-de-Marie-Partie-Sud. On October 24, 2001, Sainte-Anne-du-Lac joined the new municipality.

Adstock was named after the township in which the former municipality of Saint-Méthode-de-Frontenac lies. The township was itself named after the village of Adstock in Buckinghamshire, England.

References

External links

Municipalities in Quebec
Incorporated places in Chaudière-Appalaches